People's National Congress may refer to:

 People's National Congress (Guyana), a political party in Guyana
 People's National Congress (Maldives), a political party in the Maldives
 People's National Congress (Papua New Guinea), a political party in Papua New Guinea

See also 
National People's Congress, the state legislature of the People's Republic of China
 People's Congress (disambiguation)
 National Congress (disambiguation)